Rantoul may refer to:

Places
In the United States:
Rantoul, Illinois
Rantoul (Amtrak station), a train station in Rantoul, Illinois
Rantoul, Kansas
Rantoul, Wisconsin

People
Robert Rantoul, Jr., US Senator and US Representative from Massachusetts
Robert S. Rantoul, mayor of Salem, Massachusetts